Raul Costa Seibeb (7 February 1992 – 1 May 2017) was a Namibian professional racing cyclist. In 2014 he won the Namibian National Road Race Championships. He died on 1 May 2017 in a car accident.

Major results

2013
 National Road Championships
2nd Road race
3rd Time trial
 9th Time trial, African Road Championships
2014
 National Road Championships
1st  Road race
2nd Time trial
2015
 2nd Time trial, National Road Championships
2016
 3rd Road race, National Road Championships
2017
 National Road Championships
2nd Time trial
3rd Road race

References

External links
 
 

1992 births
2017 deaths
Namibian male cyclists
Sportspeople from Windhoek